"Been Down So Long" is a song by the American rock band the Doors. It appears as the third song on L.A. Woman, the last studio album that lead singer Jim Morrison recorded with the group. It has been called, notably by critic Robert Christgau, as a "take-off" on the album.

A live version recorded on May 8, 1970, at Cobo Arena in Detroit, appears on the 2000 compilation album The Bright Midnight Sampler.

Lyrics

The song's lyrics were written by lead singer and frontman Jim Morrison, though the performance rights organization ASCAP, along with the actual album liner notes, has given the songwriting credit to all members of the group.

Morrison's lyrics draws upon themes of depression, liberation, and sexuality, referring to his imprisonments during live performances. The title makes reference to Richard Fariña's book Been Down So Long It Looks Like Up to Me, and was influenced by the lyrics of Furry Lewis's 1928 song, "I Will Turn Your Money Green": "I been down so long/It seem like up to me."  It is also considered to be Morrison at his most "mock tough", and his disapproval of the judicial system in the US.

Music and contributions
Session musician Jerry Scheff contributed on bass guitar, while the rhythm guitars were played by Marc Benno and keyboardist Ray Manzarek. Musically, "Been Down So Long" is a conventional blues song, with rambunctious aggression, and having the "old Doors, slow blues" style.  It features a distinct slide guitar by Robby Krieger, a rough sound, and a stomping beat. In response to Morrison's bluesy interpretation in an interview with L.A. Weekly, Elektra Records president Jac Holzman said about Morrison's general enthusiasm for the blues during that time:

Critical response
In his music reference book Rock Albums of the '70s: A Critical Guide, published in 1981, Robert Christgau considered L.A. Woman to be the Doors' greatest effort; however he also deemed "Been Down So Long" along with "L'America" as one of the few "disappointing" tracks of the album. Will Hermes of Rolling Stone rating L.A. Woman with four-and-a-half stars out five, he characterized the song as a "garage-style classic". PopMatters critic Nathan Wisnicki wrote in his review that with "Been Down So Long" the Doors "overestimated their jaming abilities", adding that the song "could've been tightened-up without losing any fire". Music journalist James Perone declared it one of the "must-hear blues songs" of the band.

Personnel
The Doors
 Jim Morrison – vocals
 Ray Manzarek – rhythm guitar
 Robby Krieger – slide guitar
 John Densmore – drums, tamburine

Additional musicians
 Jerry Scheff – bass guitar
 Marc Benno – rhythm guitar

References

Sources
 
 
 
 
 
 
 
 

 
 
 

1971 songs
The Doors songs
Song recordings produced by Bruce Botnick